Jefferson County is a county located in the U.S. state of Oklahoma. As of the 2010 census, the population was 6,472. Its county seat is Waurika. The county was created at statehood and named in honor of President Thomas Jefferson.

History
In the 1750s, the Taovaya Indians, a Wichita tribe, established twin villages along the Red River, in Jefferson County and across the river near present-day Spanish Fort, Texas. The village became "a lively emporium where Comanches brought Apache slaves, horses and mules to trade for French packs of powder, balls, knives, and textiles and for Taovaya-grown maize, melons, pumpkins, squash, and tobacco."

In 1759, in response to the destruction of the San Saba Mission, the Spanish led an expedition against the Taovaya and their allies and attacked the twin villages.  The Indians defeated the Spanish army.  (See Battle of the Twin Villages)  The Taovaya villages were abandoned before 1841 as the Taovaya had been decimated by smallpox and encroachment by other Indians and Anglo-Americans.

In the 1830s, the Choctaw tribe acquired more than two-thirds of the land now covered by Jefferson County, and the closely related Chickasaw tribe began to relocate there. In 1855, the two tribes formally divided and this area became part of the Chickasaw Nation. The western part of the present county became part of the Kiowa-Comanche-Apache Reservation, created by the 1867 Medicine Lodge Treaty. That area was opened to settlement by non-Indians by the Kiowa-Comanche-Apache Opening in 1901.

After the Civil War, the Chisholm Trail, which passed through this area, was heavily used to drive cattle from Texas to markets in Kansas. In 1892, the Chicago, Rock Island and Pacific Railway laid tracks along the trail route. The Enid and Anadarko Railway, sold to the Rock Island in 1903, built a line from Lawton to Waurika. The Wichita Falls and Oklahoma Railroad built the last railroad in the county in 1923, from Texas to Waurika. It went out of business in 1942. A railway line was built from Ardmore to Ringling.

Until statehood, the territory of the present-day county was part of Pickens County, Chickasaw Nation.

Statehood in 1907 brought about the demise of the Chickasaw government and creation of Jefferson County. At that time the southeast corner of the county extended to Mud Creek including the communities of Belleville and Courtney. In 1924 the southeast corner of the county was realigned to its current boundary. The Oklahoma Constitutional Convention named Ryan as the county seat. An election for the seat was held in 1908 between Ryan, Sugden and Waurika, but none of the towns won a majority. Another election was held in 1912, resulting in Waurika being named as the county seat.

Geography
The county drains into the Red River via Beaver and Mud creeks. Waurika Lake was created in 1971 by damming Beaver Creek in northwestern Jefferson County.

Major highways
  U.S. Highway 70
  U.S. Highway 81
  State Highway 5
  State Highway 32
  State Highway 79
  State Highway 89

Adjacent counties
 Stephens County (north)
 Carter County (northeast)
 Love County (east)
 Montague County, Texas (south)
 Clay County, Texas (southwest)
 Cotton County (west)

Demographics

At the 2000 census there were 6,818 people, 2,716 households, and 1,863 families in the county.  The population density was 9 people per square mile (3/km2).  There were 3,373 housing units at an average density of 4 per square mile (2/km2).  The racial makeup of the county was 87.14% White, 0.69% Black or African American, 5.24% Native American, 1.13% Asian, 0.03% Pacific Islander, 2.86% from other races, and 2.92% from two or more races.  7.01%. were Hispanic or Latino of any race.

Of the 2,716 households 29.20% had children under the age of 18 living with them, 55.60% were married couples living together, 9.20% had a female householder with no husband present, and 31.40% were non-families. 28.80% of households were one person and 15.40% were one person aged 65 or older.  The average household size was 2.38 and the average family size was 2.92.

The age distribution was 24.00% under the age of 18, 7.20% from 18 to 24, 25.40% from 25 to 44, 23.30% from 45 to 64, and 20.10% 65 or older.  The median age was 40 years. For every 100 females there were 94.70 males.  For every 100 females age 18 and over, there were 93.80 males.

The median household income was $23,674 and the median family income  was $30,563. Males had a median income of $25,195 versus $16,589 for females. The per capita income for the county was $12,899.  About 16.30% of families and 19.20% of the population were below the poverty line, including 23.30% of those under age 18 and 18.40% of those age 65 or over.

Politics
Despite a sizable Democratic voter registration advantage, Jefferson County has almost exclusively supported Republican candidates in almost every election of the 21st century. The last Democrat to carry the county at the presidential level was Bill Clinton of neighboring Arkansas in 1996, and the GOP vote share has only grown since, with Republican Donald Trump winning more than 80% of the county's vote in 2020, an even larger margin than four years earlier.

Communities

 Addington
 Atlee
 Cornish
 Grady
 Hastings
 Oscar
 Ringling
 Ryan
 Sugden
 Terral
 Waurika (county seat)

See also
 National Register of Historic Places listings in Jefferson County, Oklahoma

References

Further reading

External links
 Encyclopedia of Oklahoma History and Culture - Jefferson County
 Oklahoma Digital Maps: Digital Collections of Oklahoma and Indian Territory

 
Oklahoma counties
1907 establishments in Oklahoma
Populated places established in 1907